Complete Best: Back Fire is a compilation of songs and of the Japanese hard rock band Show-Ya. The collection was released in 1992 in Japan. This compilation contains the previously unpublished hard rock cover of The Beatles song "Blackbird", recorded in 1988.

Track listing
"Genkai Lovers" (限界 Lovers) - 4:02
"I Gotta Your Love" - 3:46
"Life Is Dancing" - 4:43
"Sakebi" (叫び) - 4:26
"Aisazu ni Irarenai - Still Be Hangin' On" (愛さずにいられない - Still Be Hangin' On) - 4:59
"Shidokenaku Emotion" (しどけなくエモーション) - 4:06
"One Way Heart" - 4:17
"Sono Ato De Koroshitai" (その後で殺したい) - 4:11
"Fairy" - 3:57
"Fixer" (フィクサー) - 4:45
"What Do You Say?" - 4:32
"Watashi Wa Arashi" (私は嵐) - 4:06
"Blue Rose Blues" - 5:24
"Inori" (祈り) - 4:41
"Blackbird" (Lennon–McCartney) - 3:35

Personnel

Band Members
Keiko Terada - Vocals
Miki Igarashi - Guitars
Miki Nakamura - Keyboards
Satomi Senba - Bass
Miki Tsunoda - Drums

References

Show-Ya albums
1992 greatest hits albums
EMI Records compilation albums
Japanese-language compilation albums